|}

The Prix de Diane, sometimes referred to as the French Oaks, is a Group 1 flat horse race in France open to three-year-old thoroughbred fillies. It is run at Chantilly over a distance of 2,100 metres (about 1 mile and 2½ furlongs), and it is scheduled to take place each year in June.

It is France's equivalent of The Oaks, a famous race in England.

History
The event is named after the mythological goddess Diana (in French, "Diane"). It was established in 1843, and was originally restricted to horses born and bred in France. Its distance was set at 2,100 metres, around 300 metres shorter than the English version. It was switched to Versailles during the Revolution of 1848, and was cancelled due to the Franco-Prussian War in 1871.

The Prix de Diane was abandoned throughout World War I, with no running from 1915 to 1918. The first two post-war editions were held at Longchamp, and it returned to Chantilly in 1921. It took place at Longchamp again in 1936.

The race was cancelled once during World War II, in 1940. It was staged at Longchamp in 1941 and 1942, and at Le Tremblay over 2,150 metres in 1943 and 1944. It returned to Longchamp for the following three years, and on the second occasion it was opened to foreign participants. The first foreign-trained horse to win was Sweet Mimosa in 1970.

The present system of race grading was introduced in 1971, and the Prix de Diane was classed at the highest level, Group 1. A strike by stable lads caused the 1975 running to be abandoned. That year's favourite had been Ivanjica.

The event was sponsored by Revlon from 1977 to 1982, and by Hermès from 1983 to 2007. It was not sponsored from 2008 to 2010, and has been backed by Longines since 2011.

Two fillies have won both the Prix de Diane and the English Oaks – Fille de l'Air in 1864 and Pawneese in 1976. Six Prix de Diane winners have subsequently won the Prix de l'Arc de Triomphe, most recently Treve in 2013.

Records
Leading jockey (5 wins):
 Spreoty – Serenade (1848), Hervine (1851), Dame d'Honneur (1856), Mademoiselle de Chantilly (1857), Etoile du Nord (1858)
 Charles Pratt – Geologie (1859), Finlande (1861), Stradella (1862), Fille de l'Air (1864), Sornette (1870)
 Yves Saint-Martin – La Sega (1962), Rescousse (1972), Allez France (1973), Pawneese (1976), Madelia (1977)
 Gérald Mossé – Restless Kara (1988), Shemaka (1993), Vereva (1997), Zainta (1998), Daryaba (1999)

Leading trainer (9 wins):
 Henry Jennings – Nativa (1843), Lanterne (1844), Dorade (1846), Serenade (1848), Fleur de Marie (1850), Geologie (1859), Surprise (1860), Destinee (1874), Tyrolienne (1875)

Leading owner (7 wins):
 HH Aga Khan IV – Shemaka (1993), Vereva (1997), Zainta (1998), Daryaba (1999), Zarkava (2008), Sarafina (2010), Valyra (2012)

Winners since 1969

Earlier winners

 1843: Nativa
 1844: Lanterne
 1845: Suavita
 1846: Dorade
 1847: Wirthschaft
 1848: Serenade
 1849: Vergogne
 1850: Fleur de Marie
 1851: Hervine
 1852: Bounty
 1853: Jouvence
 1854: Honesty
 1855: Ronzi
 1856: Dame d'Honneur
 1857: Mademoiselle de Chantilly
 1858: Etoile du Nord
 1859: Geologie
 1860: Surprise
 1861: Finlande
 1862: Stradella
 1863: La Toucques
 1864: Fille de l'Air
 1865: Deliane
 1866: Victorieuse
 1867: Jeune Premiere
 1868: Jenny
 1869: Peripetie
 1870: Sornette
 1871: no race
 1872: Little Agnes
 1873: Campeche
 1874: Destinee *
 1875: Tyrolienne *
 1876: Mondaine
 1877: La Jonchere
 1878: Brie
 1879: Nubienne
 1880: Versigny
 1881: Serpolette
 1882: Mademoiselle de Senlis
 1883: Verte Bonne
 1884: Fregate
 1885: Barberine
 1886: Presta
 1887: Bavarde
 1888: Solange
 1889: Criniere
 1890: Wandora
 1891: Primrose
 1892: Annita
 1893: Praline
 1894: Brisk
 1895: Kasbah
 1896: Liane
 1897: Roxelane
 1898: Cambridge
 1899: Germaine
 1900: Semendria
 1901: La Camargo
 1902: Kizil Kourgan
 1903: Rose de Mai
 1904: Profane
 1905: Clyde
 1906: Flying Star
 1907: Saint Astra
 1908: Medeah
 1909: Union
 1910: Marsa
 1911: Rose Verte
 1912: Qu'elle Est Belle
 1913: Moia
 1914: Alerte
 1915–18: no race
 1919: Quenouille
 1920: Flowershop
 1921: Doniazade
 1922: Pellsie
 1923: Quoi
 1924: Uganda
 1925: Aquatinte
 1926: Dorina
 1927: Fairy Legend
 1928: Mary Legend
 1929: Ukrania
 1930: Commanderie
 1931: Pearl Cap
 1932: Perruche Bleue
 1933: Vendange
 1934: Adargatis
 1935: Peniche
 1936: Mistress Ford
 1937: En Fraude
 1938: Feerie
 1939: Lysistrata
 1940: no race
 1941: Sapotille
 1942: Vigilance
 1943: Caravelle
 1944: Pointe a Pitre
 1945: Nikellora
 1946: Pirette
 1947: Montenica
 1948: Corteira
 1949: Bagheera
 1950: Aglae Grace
 1951: Stratonice
 1952: Seria
 1953: La Sorellina
 1954: Tahiti
 1955: Douve
 1956: Apollonia
 1957: Cerisoles
 1958: Dushka
 1959: Barquette
 1960: Timandra
 1961: Hermieres
 1962: La Sega
 1963: Belle Ferronniere
 1964: Belle Sicambre
 1965: Blabla
 1966: Fine Pearl
 1967: Gazala
 1968: Roseliere

* The 1874 and 1875 races finished as dead-heats, but each was decided by a run-off.

See also
 List of French flat horse races

References

Racing Post/France Galop:

galop.courses-france.com

Other 

 france-galop.com – A Brief History: Prix de Diane.
 galopp-sieger.de – Prix de Diane.
 horseracingintfed.com – International Federation of Horseracing Authorities – Prix de Diane (2017).
 pedigreequery.com – Prix de Diane – Chantilly.
 tbheritage.com – Prix de Diane.

Flat horse races for three-year-old fillies
Chantilly Racecourse
Horse races in France
Recurring sporting events established in 1843
1843 establishments in France